Kate Sayer (born 8 March 2003) is an Australian artistic gymnast and the 2018 Pacific Rim Gymnastics Championships junior bronze medalist on balance beam.  She represented Australia at the 2018 Youth Olympic Games.

Early life 
Kate Sayer was born in Queensland, Australia in 2003.  She began gymnastics when she was four years old.

Gymnastics career

Junior

2017–18
Sayer competed at the 2017 Australian National Championships.  She placed fifth in the Junior 14 All-Around Final and placed second on vault and uneven bars and fourth on balance beam.

In April 2018 Sayer was selected to compete at the Pacific Rim Championships.  While there she helped Australia finish third in the team final behind the United States and Canada.  She finished 14th in the all-around  During event finals she won bronze on the balance beam behind Zoé Allaire-Bourgie of Canada and American Sunisa Lee.  Additionally she placed seventh on vault and eighth on floor exercise.  The following month Sayer competed at the Australian National Championships where she won the junior all-around competition.

In August Sayer was selected to represent Australia at the 2018 Summer Youth Olympics.  In September she competed at the Australian Classic where she once again won the junior division title.

At the Youth Olympic Games in Buenos Aires Sayer qualified to the all-around, vault, and floor exercise finals.  In the all-around final she placed eighth.  During event finals she placed seventh and eighth respectively.

Senior

2019 
In 2019, Sayer turned senior.  She made her debut at the Melbourne World Cup where she only competed on floor exercise.  She finished 9th in qualifications and was the first reserve for the final.  In March she competed at the 2019 L'International Gymnix.  She helped Australia win the bronze medal.  Individually Sayer placed 17th in the all-around.  In May she competed at the Australian National Championships where she finished 11th in the all-around.  In September she competed at the Australian Classic where she finished 8th.  Sayer was selected as the alternate to the team who would compete at the 2019 World Championships in Stuttgart.

Competitive history

References

External links 
 

2003 births
Living people
Australian female artistic gymnasts
Gymnasts at the 2018 Summer Youth Olympics
Sportswomen from Queensland
21st-century Australian women